Margaret Macfarlane (born 1888) was a Scottish suffragette and honorary secretary of the Women's Social and Political Union in Dundee and East Fife.

Suffragette activity 
From at least 1911, Macfarlane, a trained nurse, had started working for the cause of women's suffrage. In 1911, when Emmeline Pankhurst embarked on a speaking tour of Scotland, Macfarlane helped to co-organise a "crowded" public meeting in St Andrews, which was chaired by the secretary of the St Andrews branch of the National Union of Women's Suffrage Societies.

Her increasingly militant advocacy for women's suffrage led to her arrest in London in November 1911, at the age of 23. She was charged with breaking one of the largest windows in London at the office of the Hamburg America Line at Cockspur Street, valued at £104, and sentenced in March 1912 to four months in HM Prison Holloway. She was one of 68 women who added their signatures or initials to The Suffragette Handkerchief embroidered by prisoners in Holloway in March 1912, and kept until 1950 by Mary Ann Hilliard, and still available to view at the Priest House West Hoathly.

Macfarlane refused to eat in prison and was regularly force fed until her release at the end of June 1912. Her weight, she said, dropped from 7st 5lb on her entry to prison to 6st 6lb on her release. She later described her experience of force feeding:

Macfarlane continued her political work on her release, appearing in court again in January 1913 on charges of breaking a window of the Home Office and doing damage worth £2. She was ordered to pay the damage and a fine of 40 shillings.

References

Scottish suffragists
Scottish suffragettes
British women's rights activists
1888 births
Year of death missing
Hunger Strike Medal recipients